Retinal homeobox protein Rx also known as retina and anterior neural fold homeobox is a protein that in humans is encoded by the RAX gene. The RAX gene is located on chromosome 18 in humans, mice, and rats.

Function 

This gene encodes a homeobox-containing transcription factor that functions in eye development. The gene is expressed early in the eye primordia, and is required for retinal cell fate determination and also regulates stem cell proliferation.

Towards the end of late gastrulation a single eye field has formed and splits into bilateral fields via action by the signaling molecule, sonic hedgehog (Shh) secreted from the forebrain. Rax and Six-3 (also a transcription factor) maintain the forebrain's ability to secrete Shh by inhibiting activity of the signaling molecule Wnt.

Rax (Retina and Anterior Neural Fold Homeobox) is a gene in the OAR (Otx, Arx,& Rax) subgroup of the paired-like homeodomain family of transcription factors. Discovered in 1997, the Rax gene is known to contribute to the development of the retina, hypothalamus, pineal gland and pituitary gland.

Clinical significance 

Mutations in this gene have been reported in patients with defects in ocular development, including microphthalmia, anophthalmia, and coloboma.

Mutations to the Rax gene cause malformation of the retinal field, including anophthalmia and microphthalmia.

Individuals who have a mutation in the RAX gene fail to develop ocular structures, referred to as anophthalmia. RAX mutant individuals can also have microphthalmia, where one or both of the eyes is smaller than normal.

Animal studies 

Rax genes are conserved among vertebrates. RAX knockout mice have no eyes and abnormal forebrain formation. In the frog Xenopus tropicalis, Rax mutants are eyeless; the future retinal tissue instead has diencephalon and telencephalon features. Due to a genome duplication at the basis of the teleost fish lineage, fishes contain three Rax genes: Rx1, Rx2, and Rx3. Zebrafish and medaka mutants in Rx3 are eyeless.

References  

Transcription factors